Jacopo Coletta (born 19 April 1992) is an Italian professional footballer who plays as a goalkeeper for  club Lucchese.

Club career
Born in Rome, Coletta started his career in ChievoVerona youth sector. For the 2012–13 season, he was loaned to Lega Pro club Lumezzane. He made his professional debut on 20 January 2013 against Pavia.

On 10 October 2019, he signed with Serie D club Lucchese as a free agent.

References

External links
 
 

1992 births
Living people
Footballers from Rome
Italian footballers
Association football goalkeepers
Serie C players
Lega Pro Seconda Divisione players
Serie D players
A.C. ChievoVerona players
F.C. Lumezzane V.G.Z. A.S.D. players
S.P.A.L. players
S.S. Racing Club Fondi players
S.S. Racing Club Roma players
AZ Picerno players
Lucchese 1905 players